William Stevenson (born 26 October 1939) is a Scottish former professional football player and manager. He played for Rangers, Liverpool, Stoke City, Tranmere Rovers and the Vancouver Whitecaps.

Career

Rangers
Stevenson was born in Leith, Midlothian. He played for Edina Hearts and Dalkeith Thistle before turning professional with Rangers. He immediately became a regular in the side, winning the Scottish Football League in his first season and the Scottish Cup in his second while also being involved in the semi-finals of the 1959–60 European Cup and earning selection for the Scottish Football League XI, but then lost his first team place after Jim Baxter joined Rangers in 1960; Baxter initially played at inside forward before being moved to Stevenson's left half berth.

After two seasons as a reserve (appearing in only 8 matches as the club won another title and watching on as they won three more major cup finals), Stevenson declined to sign a new contract with Rangers and went out to Australia in the summer of 1962, but was still registered with the Glasgow club and was not permitted to play official matches with local clubs, so he returned to Scotland and both Liverpool and Preston North End put in bids to sign him.

Liverpool
Bill Shankly paid £20,000 to bring the 22-year-old to Liverpool in October 1962. He made his debut in the 2–1 home league defeat to Burnley on 3 November 1962, he scored his first goal in a 5–0 victory over Leyton Orient at Anfield, Stevenson managed to hit the net in the 35th minute, Roger Hunt with a hat-trick and Ian St John scored the others. Stevenson helped the Reds gain the 1963–64 First Division title in only their 2nd season back in the top flight of English football, he featured in 38 of the 42 league games thus cementing a starting role on the left of the Reds midfield.

He played a major role in winning of Liverpool's first ever FA Cup in 1965, he played in all of the ties scoring the second goal from the penalty spot in the 2–0 semi-final victory over Chelsea at Villa Park. Leeds United stood in Shankly's team's way and after a 0–0 draw in 90 minutes, goals from Hunt and St John beat the Elland Road club by 2 goals to 1 to take the trophy go to Anfield after a 72-year wait. The following campaign, again, saw silverware head to Merseyside as the Reds took the league title once more. Stevenson missed just the one fixture and scored five times as Liverpool topped the table by a comfortable 6 points over Leeds. He also tasted disappointment, however, as Borussia Dortmund beat Liverpool 2–1 in the European Cup Winners Cup final at Hampden Park, the 1st European final the Anfield club had reached.

Shankly had bought 19-year-old Emlyn Hughes from Blackpool in February 1967 and selected him ahead of Stevenson at the beginning of the 1967–68 season – this proved to be a turning point in Stevenson's career, he got the nod just once in the league and three times in the Fairs Cup. By December 1967 he was on his way, leaving for Stoke City.

Stoke City
Stoke manager Tony Waddington paid £30,000 for Stevenson as a replacement for the departed Calvin Palmer. He played 20 games in 1967–68 and 34 times in 1968–69 as Stoke had two poor seasons, narrowly avoiding relegation. A much improved 1969–70 campaign saw Stevenson play 23 games as Stoke finished in 9th. He played six matches at the start of 1970–71 before injury ruled him out for the remainder of the season. He played 25 games in 1971–72 and just three in 1972–73. At the end of the season he left the Victoria Ground after making 111 appearances scoring seven goals.

Tranmere Rovers

He joined Third Division Tranmere Rovers where he made 27 appearances.

Later career
In 1974, he joined the Vancouver Whitecaps in the newly formed North American Soccer League (NASL). He played in Vancouver for one season.

He then played for Limerick before returning to the UK to play for non-league Macclesfield Town. He also spent a short time in South Africa playing for Hellenic.

After football

He spent time as a publican and then ran a contract cleaning company in Macclesfield where he lived.

Career statistics
Source:

A.  The "Other" column constitutes appearances and goals in the Anglo-Scottish Cup, Glasgow Cup, FA Charity Shield and Texaco Cup.

Honours
Rangers
Scottish League champions: 1958–59
Scottish Cup: 1959–60

 Liverpool
 Football League First Division champions: 1963–64, 1965–66
 FA Cup winners: 1965
 FA Charity Shield winners: 1964, 1965, 1966
 UEFA Cup Winners' Cup runners-up: 1966

References

External links
 

1939 births
Living people
Scottish footballers
People from Leith
Footballers from Edinburgh
Rangers F.C. players
Dalkeith Thistle F.C. players
Liverpool F.C. players
Stoke City F.C. players
Hellenic F.C. players
Limerick F.C. players
Tranmere Rovers F.C. players
Macclesfield Town F.C. managers
Scottish Junior Football Association players
Scottish Football League players
English Football League players
Scottish football managers
Association football wing halves
Scottish Football League representative players
Vancouver Whitecaps (1974–1984) players
Scottish expatriate footballers
Expatriate soccer players in Canada
Expatriate association footballers in the Republic of Ireland
Expatriate soccer players in South Africa
North American Soccer League (1968–1984) players
League of Ireland players
People educated at Ainslie Park High School
Scottish expatriate sportspeople in Canada
Scottish expatriate sportspeople in South Africa
Scottish expatriate sportspeople in Ireland
FA Cup Final players